The Brunnethorn is a mountain of the Swiss Pennine Alps, overlooking Oberems in the canton of Valais. It is located north of the higher Bella Tola.

References

External links
 Brunnethorn on Hikr

Mountains of the Alps
Mountains of Switzerland
Mountains of Valais
Two-thousanders of Switzerland